Total Sports may refer to:

 Total Sports Publishing
 Total Sports Entertainment
 Total Sports TV
 Total Sports Network